A list of films produced in Spain in 1976 (see 1976 in film).
Tapas (film)

1976

External links
 Spanish films of 1976 at the Internet Movie Database

1976
Spanish
Films